Eurico Dias Nogueira  (6 March 1923 – 19 May 2014)  was a Portuguese Prelate of Catholic Church.

Nogueira was born in Dornelas do Zêzere, Portugal and was ordained a priest on 22 December 1945. Nogueira was appointed bishop to the Diocese of Vila Cabral on 10 July 1964 and ordained bishop on 6 December 1964. Nogueira was then appointed bishop of the Diocese of Sá da Bandeira on 19 February 1972 and resigned from the position on 3 February 1977. Nogueira's final appointment to Archbishop-Primate of the Archdiocese of Braga and he retired as archbishop on 5 June 1999.

References

External links
Catholic-Hierarchy
Braga Diocese (Portuguese)

1923 births
2014 deaths
20th-century Roman Catholic bishops in Mozambique
20th-century Roman Catholic bishops in Angola
Roman Catholic archbishops of Braga
Participants in the Second Vatican Council
Roman Catholic bishops of Lichinga
Roman Catholic archbishops of Lubango